Ostrea is a genus of edible oysters, marine bivalve mollusks in the family Ostreidae, the oysters.

Fossil records

This genus is very ancient. It is known in the fossil records from the Permian to the Quaternary (age range: from 259 to 0.0 million years ago). Fossil shells of these molluscs can be found all over the world.  Genus Ostrea includes about 150 extinct species.

History

At least one species within this genus, Ostrea lurida, has been recovered in archaeological excavations along the Central California coast of the Pacific Ocean, demonstrating it was a marine taxon exploited by the Native American Chumash people as a food source.

Species
Species in the genus Ostrea include:

 † Ostrea albertensis Russell & Landes, 1937
 Ostrea algoensis G. B. Sowerby II, 1871
Ostrea angasi G.B. Sowerby II, 1871
 Ostrea angelica Rochebrune, 1895
 † Ostrea angusta Deshayes, 1824
 † Ostrea anomialis Lamarck, 1819
 † Ostrea antarctica Zinsmeister, 1984
 † Ostrea arcula Marwick, 1928 
 † Ostrea arenicola Tate, 1886
Ostrea atherstonei Newton, 1913
 † Ostrea awajiensis Matsubara, 1998 
 † Ostrea beloiti Logan, 1899
 † Ostrea blackensis Stephenson, 1923
 † Ostrea brongniarti Bronn, 1856
 † Ostrea californica Mareon, 1858
 † Ostrea carolinensis Conrad, 1832
 † Ostrea castellobrancoi Maury 1936
 Ostrea chilensis Philippi, 1844
 Ostrea circumpicta Pilsbry, 1904
 † Ostrea compressirostra Say, 1824
 Ostrea conchaphila Carpenter, 1857
 †Ostrea costaricensis †Olsson, 1922
 † Ostrea crenulimarginata Gabb, 1860
 † Ostrea cynthiae Maury, 1912
 † Ostrea democraciana Hodson et al., 1927
 Ostrea denselamellosa （Lischke, 1869
 † Ostrea diluviana Linnaeus, 1767
 †Ostrea dorsalis †Azzaroli, 1958
 Ostrea edulis Linnaeus, 1758- edible oyster or Belon oyster
 † Ostrea edwilsoni Stoyanow, 1949
 † Ostrea eorivularis Oyama & Mizuno, 1958
 Ostrea equestris (Say, 1834)- crested oyster
 † Ostrea erici Hertlein, 1929
 † Ostrea fraasi Mayer-Eymar, 1888
 † Ostrea frondosa de Serres, 1829
 Ostrea futamiensis Seki, 1929
 † Ostrea gajensis Vredenburg, 1928
 †Ostrea gingensis Schlotheim, 1813
 Ostrea golfotristensis †Maury 1912
 † Ostrea haleyi Hertlein, 1933
 † Ostrea hyotidoidea Tate, 1899
 † Ostrea incisa Martin, 1883
 † Ostrea invalida White, 1887
 † Ostrea jogjacartensis Martin, 1914
 † Ostrea khamirensis Cox, 1936
 † Ostrea latimarginata Vredenburg, 1908
 Ostrea libella Weisbord, 1964
 † Ostrea locklini J. Gardner, 1945 
 † Ostrea longirostris Lamarck, 1806
 † Ostrea ludensis Deshayes, 1861
 Ostrea lurida Carpenter, 1864
 † Ostrea manubriata Tate, 1887
 † Ostrea marginidentata Wood, 1861
 † Ostrea matercula de Verneuil, 1845
 † Ostrea mauricensis Gabb, 1860
 Ostrea megodon (Hanley, 1846)
 † Ostrea mesenterica Morton, 1834
 †Ostrea messor Maury, 1925
 † Ostrea minbuensis Cotter, 1923
 † Ostrea minerensis  Russell & Landes, 1937
 † Ostrea miradorensis Olsson, 1931
 † Ostrea monetalis † Martin, 1931
 Ostrea negritensis Olsson, 1928
 Ostrea neostentina L.-S. Hu, H.-Y. Wang, Z. Zhang, C. Li & X.-M. Guo, 2019
 † Ostrea normalis Gardner, 1926
 † Ostrea pangadiensis Hislop, 1859
 † Ostrea paracasensis Rivera, 1957
 † Ostrea parasitica Gmelin, 1791 (nomen dubium)
 † Ostrea paroxis Lesueur, 1829
 † O. parrensis Vega et al., 1999
 Ostrea pejerreyensis Rivera, 1957
 Ostrea permollis G. B. Sowerby II, 1871
 † Ostrea petrosa Fuchs, 1879
 † Ostrea peytoni Richards, 1947
 † Ostrea pileosimilis Martin, 1931
 † Ostrea portoricoensis Hubbard, 1920
 † Ostrea princeps Woods, 1850
 † Ostrea procyonis Maury, 1924
 † Ostrea prona Wood, 1861
 † Ostrea protoimbricata Vredenburg, 1928
 † Ostrea pseudocrassissima Fuchs, 1878
 † Ostrea pseudodigitalina Fuchs, 1879
 † Ostrea pseudorissensisVredenburg, 1928
 Ostrea puelchana d'Orbigny, 1842
 † Ostrea pulaskensis Harris, 1892
 † Ostrea raveneliana Tuomey & Holmes, 1855
 † Ostrea resupinata Deshayes, 1858
 Ostrea retusa J.C. Sowerby, 1836  (taxon inquirendum, preoccupied by Ostrea retusa O. F. Müller, 1776)
 †Ostrea russelli Russell & Landes, 1937
 † Ostrea samanensis Olsson, 1928
 † Ostrea saxitoniana †McLearn, 1929
 † Ostrea sculpturata Conrad, 1840 
 † Ostrea seymourensis Zinsmeister, 1984
 † Ostrea soleniscus Meek, 1893
 Ostrea stentina Payraudeau, 1826
 † Ostrea sturtiana Tate, 1886
 † Ostrea subangulata d'Orbigny, 1852
 † Ostrea submissa Deshayes, 1864
 † Ostrea subradiosa Bohm, 1926
 † Ostrea tacalensis Hodson et al., 1927
 † Ostrea tatei Suter, 1913
 † Ostrea tayloriana Gabb, 1866
 † Ostrea thalassoklusta Maury, 1912
 † Ostrea turkestanensis Romanovski, 1880
 † Ostrea uncinta Lamarck, 1806
 † Ostrea ungulata Nyst, 1843
 † Ostrea ventilabrum Goldfuss, 1826
 † Ostrea vestita Fuchs, 1883
 † Ostrea waitangiensis Marwick, 1928 
 † Ostrea wiedenmayeri Hodson et al., 1927

Synonyms
 † Ostrea angulata Sowerby, 1840: synonym of Crassostrea angulata (Lamarck, 1819) accepted as Magallana angulata (Lamarck, 1819)
Ostrea aupouria Dinamani, 1981: synonym of Ostrea equestris Say, 1834
Ostrea bicolor †Hanley, 1854: synonym of Crassostrea tulipa (Lamarck, 1819)
 † Ostrea cochlear Poli, 1795: synonym of Neopycnodonte cochlear (Poli, 1795)
 † Ostrea cristata Born, 1778: synonym of Ostrea edulis Linnaeus, 1758 (misapplication)
 † Ostrea cubitus Deshayes, 1832: synonym of † Cubitostrea cubitus (Deshayes, 1832)  (original combination)
 † Ostrea cumingiana Dunker, 1846: synonym of Alectryonella plicatula (Gmelin, 1791)
 Ostrea flavicans Linnaeus, 1758: synonym of Semipallium flavicans (Linnaeus, 1758)
 † Ostrea forskali Chemnitz, 1785: synonym of Ostrea forskahlii Gmelin, 1791 : synonym of Saccostrea cuccullata (Born, 1778)
 Ostrea glabra Linnaeus, 1758: synonym of Flexopecten glaber (Linnaeus, 1758)
 Ostrea hippopus Tate, 1886: synonym of Ostrea edulis Linnaeus, 1758
 † Ostrea imbricata Lamarck, 1819: synonym of Hyotissa inermis (G. B. Sowerby II, 1871)
 Ostrea iridescens Hanley, 1854: synonym of Striostrea prismatica (Gray, 1825)
 † Ostrea lutaria Hutton, 1873: synonym of Ostrea chilensis Küster, 1844
 Ostrea maculosa Forskål, 1775: synonym of Gloripallium maculosum (Forsskål in Niebuhr, 1775)
 Ostrea minuta Linnaeus, 1758: synonym of Haumea minuta (Linnaeus, 1758)
 Ostrea obliterata Linnaeus, 1758: synonym of Dentamussium obliteratum (Linnaeus, 1758)
 Ostrea pellucens Linnaeus, 1758: synonym of Caribachlamys pellucens (Linnaeus, 1758)
 Ostrea pesfelis Linnaeus, 1758: synonym of Manupecten pesfelis (Linnaeus, 1758)
 Ostrea plicatula Gmelin, 1791: synonym of Alectryonella plicatula (Gmelin, 1791)
 Ostrea radula Linnaeus, 1758: synonym of Decatopecten radula (Linnaeus, 1758)
 Ostrea sanguinea Linnaeus, 1758: synonym of Mimachlamys sanguinea (Linnaeus, 1758)
 Ostrea striatula Linnaeus, 1758: synonym of Annachlamys striatula (Linnaeus, 1758)
 Ostrea superficialis Forskål, 1775: synonym of Laevichlamys superficialis (Forsskål in Niebuhr, 1775)
 Ostrea tridacnaeformis Cox, 1927: synonym of Nicaisolopha tridacnaeformis (Cox, 1927)
 † Ostrea wollastoni Finlay, 1927: synonym of † Flemingostrea wollastoni (Finlay, 1927)

See also
 Shellfish

References

 Vialov O. (1936). Sur la classification des huîtres. Comptes Rendus (Doklady) de l'Académie des Sciences de l'URSS. ser. 2, 4(1): 17-20
 James Dwight Dana (1996) Manual of Geology: Treating of the Principles of the Science with Special Reference to American Geological History, American Book Co., 1088 pages
 C.Michael Hogan (2008) Morro Creek, The Megalithic Portal, ed. by A. Burnham 
 Coan, E. V.; Valentich-Scott, P. (2012). Bivalve seashells of tropical West America. Marine bivalve mollusks from Baja California to northern Peru. 2 vols, 1258 pp

External links
 Linnaeus, C. (1758). Systema Naturae per regna tria naturae, secundum classes, ordines, genera, species, cum characteribus, differentiis, synonymis, locis. Editio decima, reformata [10th revised edition, vol. 1: 824 pp. Laurentius Salvius: Holmiae]
 Harry, H.W. (1985). Synopsis of the supraspecific classification of living oysters (Bivalvia: Gryphaeidae and Ostreidae. The Veliger. 28(2): 121-158
 Orton J.H. (1928). The dominant species of Ostrea. Nature. 121 (3044): 320-321
 Ward, L.W. & Blackwelder, B.W. (1987). Late Pliocene and early Pleistocene Mollusca from the James City and Chowan River Formations at the Lee Creek Mine. Smithsonian Contributions to Paleobiology. 61: 113-283
 Archer, T. C. (1860). On a species of Ostrea taken from the copper sheathing on the bottom of a vessel in the Liverpool Graving Docks. Annals and Magazine of Natural History. Ser. 3, 5: 404-405
 '._('Print page').'Mineralienatlas - Fossilienatlas: Ostrea

 
Extant Permian first appearances
Bivalve genera